Cédric Horjak (born 24 February 1979 in Saint-Étienne) is a French former football midfielder.

Horjak has previously played in Ligue 2 for AS Saint-Étienne. He has also played for Lausanne-Sports, FC Arlès-Avignon and Nîmes Olympique.

References

1979 births
Living people
French footballers
AS Saint-Étienne players
Nîmes Olympique players
FC Lausanne-Sport players
Footballers from Saint-Étienne
Association football midfielders
21st-century French people